The 1938 Utah Utes football team was an American football team that represented the University of Utah as a member of the Mountain States Conference (MSC) during the 1938 college football season. In their 14th season under head coach Ike Armstrong, the Utes compiled an overall record of 7–1–2 with a mark of 4–0–2 in conference play, won the MSC championship, defeated New Mexico in the 1939 Sun Bowl, and outscored all opponents by a total of 187 to 36.

Tackle Barney McGarry was the team captain. McGarry was also selected by the Central Press as a first-team player on the 1938 All-America team. Four players won all-conference honors: McGarry; end Bruce Balkan; center Ernest Baldwin; and halfback Paul Snow.

Schedule

After the season

NFL Draft
Utah had one player selected in the 1939 NFL Draft.

References

Utah
Utah Utes football seasons
Mountain States Conference football champion seasons
Sun Bowl champion seasons
Utah Utes football